Mamqan District is in Azarshahr County, East Azerbaijan province, Iran. At the 2006 census, its population was 10,874 in 3,259 households. The following census in 2011 counted 13,365 people in 3,608 households. At the latest census in 2016, the district had 11,892 inhabitants living in 3,937 households.

References 

Azarshahr County

Districts of East Azerbaijan Province

Populated places in East Azerbaijan Province

Populated places in Azarshahr County